George Webbe (1856 – 7 June 1934) was a New Zealand cricketer who played three first-class matches for Wellington. He was born in Galway, Ireland, and died in Levin, New Zealand.

References

External links 
 CricketArchive.

1856 births
1934 deaths
New Zealand people of Irish descent
New Zealand cricketers
Wellington cricketers